Anapu is a city in Pará, Brazil. Its population in 2020 was 28,607 inhabitants. The territorial area of Anapu is 11,895 km².

Anapu's rain forests are subject to massive clearcutting.

Anapu attracted international attention on February 12, 2005, when the American-born, naturalized Brazilian citizen Sister Dorothy Stang—member of the Sisters of Notre Dame de Namur, and advocate for the rural poor of the Amazon Rainforest—was murdered there.

References

Municipalities in Pará